The Miss Paraguay 2006 was held on April 14, 2006. That year, only 18 candidates were competing for the national crown. The chosen winner represented Paraguay at the Miss Universe 2006 pageant.

Results

Special awards
 Best Face - Cristina Benítez (Asunción)
 Miss Photogenic (voted by press reporters) - Lourdes Arévalos (Alto Paraguay)
 Miss Congeniality (voted by contestants) - Adriana Barrios (Concepción)
 Miss Elegance - Raquel Duarte (Presidente Hayes)

Delegates

See also
 Paraguay at major beauty pageants

External links
 Miss Universo Paraguay 2006 Official Website
 Miss Paraguay 2006
 Candidates
 Beautiful Candidates

2006
2006 beauty pageants
April 2006 events in South America